Coleophora mucronata is a moth of the family Coleophoridae.

References

mucronata
Moths described in 1994